Tyler Richard Yarema (born October 27, 1972) is a Canadian Toronto-based singer/songwriter. A self-taught pianist, Yarema’s early influences in music stem from the stride genre, and he takes his cues from musicians such as Willie “the lion” Smith, Fats Waller, Pete Johnson, Lionel Hampton, and Duke Ellington.  Yarema’s bands specialize in a unique hybrid of blues, jump-blues, swing, boogie-woogie, and original popular music.

Career 

After moving from Thunder Bay to Toronto in 1994, Yarema became a nightclub regular. Yarema gained traction by playing alongside the late Jeff Healey, Chris Whiteley, King Biscuit Boy, Downchild Blues Band, and the late Doug Riley before forming his own band entitled Tyler Yarema and His Rhythm.  Yarema has since played, produced, arranged, and sung on over 40 albums.

Currently, Yarema is working on a recording project through the vehicle of his band Empire Avenue that steers away from traditional jazz and blues and focuses on an original sounding adult pop.

Awards & recognitions 
1998 – New Artist of The Year – Maple Blues Awards (winner)
1999 – Piano Player of the Year – Maple Blues Awards (winner)
2002 – Best Keyboard Player – Now Magazine (winner)

References

1972 births
Living people
Canadian male singer-songwriters
Musicians from Toronto
Musicians from Thunder Bay
21st-century Canadian male singers